The Phileurini are a tribe of beetles in the subfamily Dynastinae.

Subtribes and Genera
subtribe Cryptodina Burmeister & Schaum, 1840
 Cryptodus MacLeay, 1819
subtribe Phileurina Burmeister, 1847

 Archophileurus Kolbe, 1910
 Caymania Ratcliffe & Cave, 2010
 Ceratophileurus Ohaus, 1911
 Chiliphileurus Endrödi, 1977
 Cnemidophileurus Kolbe, 1910
 Goniophileurus Kolbe, 1910
 Haplophileurus Kolbe, 1910
 Hemiphileurus Kolbe, 1910
 Homophileurus Kolbe, 1910
 Hovophileurus Arrow, 1911
 Metaphileurus Kolbe, 1910
 Oryctophileurus Kolbe, 1910
 Phileurus Latreille, 1807
 Prosphileurus Kolbe, 1905

Subtribe not assigned

 Actinobolus Westwood, 1841
 Allophileurinus Dupuis & Dechambre, 2001
 Amblyodus Westwood, 1878
 Amblyoproctus Kolbe, 1910
 Archophanes Kolbe, 1905
 Eophileurus Arrow, 1908
 Macrocyphonistes Ohaus, 1910
 Microphileurus Kolbe, 1910
 Mictophileurus Ohaus, 1911
 Moraguesia Dechambre, 2008
 Palaeophileurus Kolbe, 1910
 Paraphileurus Endrödi, 1978
 Phileucourtus Dechambre, 2008
 Planophileurus Chapin, 1932
 Platyphileurus Ohaus, 1910
 Pseudosyrichthus Péringuey, 1901
 Rhizoplatodes Péringuey, 1901
 Rhizoplatys Westwood, 1841
 Syrichthodontus Péringuey, 1901
 Syrichthomorphus Péringuey, 1901
 Syrichthoschema Janssens, 1942
 Syrichthus Burmeister, 1847
 Trioplus Burmeister, 1847

References

External links
 
 

Dynastinae
Beetle tribes